Gerald N. "Jerry" Knightley is a Canadian retired ice hockey Winger and coach who was a two-time All-American for Rensselaer.

Career
Knightley was one of the final recruits for Ned Harkness with the Engineers, arriving in Troy in the fall of 1961. Knightley's first season with the varsity team was the last for the legendary bench boss and Knightley produced tremendous results alongside Bob Brinkworth. Unfortunately, the team's defense was rather porous, allowing more than 4 goals per game, and RPI was unable to make the conference tournament. After Harkness' departure, Rube Bjorkman was installed as the head coach and the team's defense improved tremendously. Knightley and Brinkworth, who served as co-captains for the season, formed a powerful scoring duo that finished 1st and 2nd in the nation with Knightly leading the way (75 points). Knightley was named First Team All-ECAC and an All-American and got the Engineers into the conference tournament. RPI finished in third place, and weren't expecting to receive a bid to the NCAA Tournament, however, the conference runner-up St. Lawrence possessed a worse record and were passed over in favor of the 17–7 Engineers. RPI fell to Denver in the semifinal but Knightley helped the team recover to win the consolation game and was named to the All-Tournament Second Team.

Bjorkman left after one season and former standout Garry Kearns took over, however, the team was beginning to suffer from two years of little to no recruiting. With Brinkworth gone due to graduation the team's offense was led almost exclusively by Knightley. He finished with just 49 points on the year but still had 11 more than the next Engineer. While ECAC Hockey had split into two divisions, RPI still declined in the standings and missed out on the postseason. Knightley was still highly regarded for leading his team through a difficult season and was named an All-American once more.

After graduating with a degree in management engineering, Knightley returned to Ontario and attended Western Ontario. While earning his MBA Knightley also played for the Mustangs. He was inducted into the RPI Athletic Hall of Fame in 1968.

Career statistics

Regular season and playoffs

Awards and honors

References

External links

Year of birth missing (living people)
Living people
Canadian ice hockey forwards
Sportspeople from Scarborough, Toronto
Ice hockey people from Toronto
RPI Engineers men's ice hockey players
Western Mustangs players
AHCA Division I men's ice hockey All-Americans